Maria Luiza Boulevard, also called Maria Luiza, which is the Bulgarian transliteration of Marie Louise, is a central boulevard in Sofia. It connects Central Railway Station and Vitosha Boulevard which is its continuation to the National Palace of Culture. The boulevard passes over one of the city's most emblematic bridges, Lavov Most (meaning Lion's Bridge). It is named after Marie Louise of Bourbon-Parma, princess-consort of Bulgaria and wife to Ferdinand I. During communist period the boulevard was named after Georgi Dimitrov.

Many landmarks are situated on the Marie Louise Boulevard or in the vicinity. On the boulevard itself are located the Central Sofia Market Hall, TZUM, St Nedelya Church, and one of Sofia's largest hotels Sheraton Sofia Hotel Balkan. Close to Marie Louise are administrative and governmental edifices such as the Presidency, the Counsel of Ministers, the offices of the deputies (which form the Largo), the yellow-paved Prince Alexander of Battenberg Square and others. The newly opened Knyaginya Maria Luiza Metro Station is located on the road.

Gallery 

Streets in Sofia